is a popular Japanese food. It consists of Japanese curry wrapped in a piece of dough, which is then coated in bread crumbs and deep fried. On occasion it is baked instead of deep fried, but deep frying is the most common method of cooking. Curry bread is usually found in bakeries and convenience stores.

In popular culture
Karē pan man is one of the superheroes in Anpanman. He has a head made out of curry bread.

See also

References

External links

How to make curry bread
	

Japanese cuisine
Japanese breads
East Asian curries
Curry dishes